Events from the year 1317 in the Kingdom of Scotland.

Incumbents
Monarch – Robert I

Events
 John de Lindsay elected Bishop of Glasgow

See also

 Timeline of Scottish history

References

 
Years of the 14th century in Scotland
Wars of Scottish Independence